Hutchins' tree frog (Boana hutchinsi) is a species of frog in the family Hylidae found in Colombia and possibly Brazil and Peru. Its natural habitats are subtropical or tropical moist lowland forests and rivers. It is threatened by habitat loss.

References

hutchinsi
Amphibians of Colombia
Amphibians described in 1984
Taxonomy articles created by Polbot